The hedge fund industry in China was established in the early 1990s, and has so far undergone four stages: infancy, formation, rapid expansion, and adjustment and standardization.

Categories
Currently hedge funds in China fall into two categories. One is those companies backed up by the government, including brokers managing pooled property, trust and investment companies' trust and investment projects, and investment companies managing their own capital. The other is private hedge funds. Under the name of "Investment Consulting Company" or "Investment Management Company", they provide management for pooled property. Examples of notable private hedge funds include Hillhouse Capital Group, High-Flyer and Ubiquant.

Economic growth trend
Against the background of China's fast growing economy, the number of hedge fund investors is increasing rapidly in the country, and the total amount of their wealth is increasing in step. By the end of June 2008, China's residents had RMB 19,460bn ($2,820bn) in bank deposits, of which 80% was in the name of 20% of the population. With such a huge amount of cash assets in hand, the wealthy's strong investment demand has provided hedge funds in China with a sufficient supply of capital. In addition, China's companies also have a huge sum of spare cash, which is also a primary source of capital for hedge funds.

Share of GDP
Data showed that hedge funds account for 0.6% of the GDP in the USA, 0.35% in Europe, 0.2% in Asia, while only 0.1% in China. It is expected that China's GDP would quadruple in 10 years time and hedge funds would be about 0.4% of the country's GDP.  In this case, China's hedge funds would expand 12-fold, and place China second in the world for hedge fund investments.

Bank deposits
Residential Bank Deposits in China 2003-2008H1

Year Residential Bank Deposits in China (billion RMB)

2003 10,360
2004 11,960
2005 14,110
2006 16,160
2007 17,250
2008H1 19,460

See also
Chinese Stock Exchanges
Commodity trading in China
Banking in China
Financial services in China
China Venture Capital Association

References 

Industry in China
Finance in China
China